Elections to Poole Borough Council were held on 5 May 2011 in line with other local elections in the United Kingdom. All 42 seats across 16 wards of this unitary authority were up for election.

There were 118 candidates nominated, comprised as follows:- 42 Conservatives, 33 Liberal Democrats, 11 UK Independence Party, 9 Independents, 11 Labour, 8 Poole People, 2 Green Party and 2 British National Party.

Election result summary

|}

Election results by ward

References

2011 English local elections
2011
2010s in Dorset